National Route 187 is a national highway of Japan connecting Iwakuni, Yamaguchi and Masuda, Shimane in Japan, with a total length of 108.4 km (67.36 mi).

References

National highways in Japan
Roads in Shimane Prefecture
Roads in Yamaguchi Prefecture